Marie Caillou (born 1971) is a French graphic artist who works on illustration, comic books and animated films.

Marie went on to study cartoon design in Brussels and began working with digital graphics. She now lives in Paris.

She has a large cult following in Japan.

Selected work

Graphic novels 
 Les monstres de Mayuko (2012)
 La ligne droite (2013)
 Adrian and the Tree of Secrets (2014) by Hubert and Caillou

Children's literature 
 Le Chat botté
 Ali Baba (2013)
 Boucle d'Or et les trois ours (2013)
 Kongjwi, l'autre Cendrillon (2013)

 Animated films 
 Marika et le loup (2003)
 Peur(s) du noir (2007), English title Fear(s) of the Dark''

References

External links 
 
 

1971 births
Living people
French comics artists
French illustrators
French graphic designers
French female comics artists
French women illustrators
French children's book illustrators
Women graphic designers
21st-century French artists
21st-century French women artists
Artists from Montbéliard